The 2004–2005 FINA Swimming World Cup was a series of eight short-course (25m) meets, held in 8 different cities from November 2004 through February 2005.

South Africa's Ryk Neethling (male) and Sweden's Anna-Karin Kammerling (female) were named the top swimmers of the series.

Meets

Event Winners
Note: Time listed in the heading are the series records at the start of the 2004-05 World Cup. Bettered records are marked with a "WC" following the time.

50 free

100 free

200 free

400 free

800/1500 free

50 back

100 back

200 back

50 breast

100 breast

200 breast

50 fly

100 fly

200 fly

100 IM

200 IM

400 IM

References

FINA Swimming World Cup
2004 in swimming
2005 in swimming